Dahlina Rosyida (born 26 February 1983) is a road cyclist from Indonesia. She represented her nation at the 2009 UCI Road World Championships.

References

External links
 profile at Procyclingstats.com

1983 births
Indonesian female cyclists
Living people
Place of birth missing (living people)